GT Capital Holdings Inc. (GTCAP) is a holdings company owned by George Ty's family.

Formation
GT Capital Holdings Inc. was founded by George Ty. Established on June 26, 2007, it has business interests in auto dealership, banking, insurance, power and real estate. On April 20, 2012, it debuted in the Philippine Stock Exchange with an initial public offering (IPO) for 47.4 million shares with additional 6 million shares earmarked for over-allotment.

Subsidiaries

Financial
 Metropolitan Bank and Trust Company (Metrobank) 
 Sumisho Motor Finance Corporation
 Philippine AXA Life Insurance Corporation

Manufacturing and automotive
 Toyota Motor Philippines Corp. (51%)
 Toyota Manila Bay Corp.
 GT Capital Auto Dealership Holdings Inc.
 Toyota Financial Services Philippines Corporation

Real estate
 Federal Land Inc.
 Horizon Land Property Development Corporation
 Grand Hyatt Manila
 Marco Polo Plaza Cebu
 Property Company of Friends Inc.

Others
 Metro Pacific Investments Corp. (15.6%)

References:

References

Holding companies established in 2007
2012 initial public offerings
Holding companies of the Philippines
Companies listed on the Philippine Stock Exchange
2007 establishments in the Philippines
Companies based in Makati